Rev. Stephen Smith (1797–1873) was an African American businessman, philanthropist, preacher, real estate developer, and abolitionist. He had lived in Pennsylvania in the 19th-century and contributed large amounts of his wealth in the effort to abolish slavery. Smith had been an agent of the Underground Railroad in Philadelphia. He co-founded and owned "Smith, Whipper & Co." a lumber business in Columbia, Pennsylvania; and later helped found the "Stephen Smith Home for the Aged".

Early life 
Stephen Smith was born in 1797 in Dauphin County, Pennsylvania to an enslaved black woman named Nancy Smith. At the age of 5, he became the indentured servant to the Pennsylvanian politician, Thomas Boude. At the age of 21, Smith had gathered enough money to purchase his freedom. In 1818, Smith purchased his freedom for US $50.

Business career  

After purchasing his freedom Smith had big plans ahead of him and in the same year of 1816 Smith opened up his own lumber business in Columbia, Pennsylvania. Smith would be very successful in the lumber business and looked for partners to grow his business even bigger. In the early 1830s Smith formed a partnership with William Whipper. Smith and Whipper would go and have huge success in the Lumber, coal, Philadelphia real estate, railroad cars, and investments in the stock market. Smith would make a big fortune with all that money Smith put it to good use and became a true leader of the black community in their efforts to fight slavery.

Smith was one of the wealthiest 19th-century black Philadelphians, holding this title alongside Frederick Douglass, James Forten, Robert Purvis, Rev. Richard Allen, Rev. Peter Williams Jr., Absalom Jones, William Whipper, and Joseph Cassey.

Abolitionist and philanthropist 
In 1830 Smith was a chairman of the African American Abolitionist Organization in the town of Colombia, Pennsylvania. Smith attended national colored conventions of the free black people held in New York State in 1834 and in Philadelphia in 1835. 

Word go out of Smith's success and many people grew jealous and felt the need to send Smith a message. In 1835 a group of unknown people vandalized the office of Smith and destroyed all his papers and records. This incident motivated Smith to abolish slavery more and more in the area. Smith would acquire a small hall in the area where African Americans would hold meetings. Smith would also help the local underground railroad that would run through Maryland and provide help all the way to Canada. After the Fugitive Slave Act of 1850 Whipper and Smith persuaded 15,000 African Americans to make their way to a new start in Canada. 

In 1864, Smith worked with the white Quakers in establishing the House for Aged and Infirm Colored Persons, which was later renamed the Stephen Smith Home for the Aged.

Smith eventually died in 1873 of unknown reason.

See also 

 History of African Americans in Philadelphia

References

External links
Colored Conventions

1797 births
1873 deaths
African-American abolitionists
African-American businesspeople
Colored Conventions people
Underground Railroad people
African-American Methodist clergy
African-American upper class